Anuja Akathoottu is a Malayalam language poet and short story writer from Kerala, India. In 2019, she received the Sahitya Akademi Yuva Puraskar for her collection of poems Amma Urangunnilla.

Biography
Anuja A. R. popularly known as Anuja Akathoottu was born in 1987 in Paipra near Muvattupuzha in Ernakulam district, as the daughter of Paipra Radhakrishnan and Nalini Bekal. She was educated at Sacred Heart, Thrissur, Little Flower, Muvattupuzha, and St. Augustine's Higher Secondary School, Muvattupuzha. She completed BSc (Agriculture) from Kerala Agricultural University with university rank and PG and PhD from Indian Agricultural Research Institute, New Delhi with IARI Gold Medal for PG. In 2009, she participated in the National Camp for Young Writers organized by the Sahitya Akademi. Anuja works as a scientist at the Central Marine Fisheries Research Institute, Kochi, and her specialisation is Agricultural/Fisheries Economics. Her husband Dr. Muhammad Aslam is working as an Assistant Professor at the Kerala Veterinary and Animal Sciences University.

Works
 Amma Urangunnilla (poetry collection), DC Books, Kottayam
 Aromayude Vastrangal (short story collection), Current Books, Thrissur
 Pothuvakya Sammelanam (short story collection), Current Books, Thrissur
 Koottu

Honors and awards
2019 Sahitya Akademi Yuva Puraskar
ONV Youth Literature Award
Abudabi Shakthi Award
Venmani Award
Tirur Thunchan Memorial Award
VT Kumaran Master Award
Binoy Chathuruthi Award
Vyloppilly Award
Ayyappa Paniker Memorial Poetry Award
Kamala Surayya Award
Atlas-Kairali Poetry Award
Anganam Literature Award
Kerala School Youth Festival State level Prize

References 

1987 births
Living people
People from Ernakulam district
Poets from Kerala
Women writers from Kerala
Malayalam poets
Indian women poets
21st-century Indian poets
21st-century Indian women writers
21st-century Indian writers
Malayalam-language writers
Indian women short story writers
Malayali people
21st-century Indian short story writers
Recipients of the Sahitya Akademi Yuva Puraskar